Maria Celeste Juan Millet (1953 in Valencia, Spain) is a Spanish politician for the Spanish Socialist Workers' Party (PSOE).

After gaining a degree in Economic and Business Sciences, Juan joined the PSOE in 1974 at a time when membership was still illegal under Francoist Spain. At the 1986 General Election, she was elected to the Spanish Congress of Deputies representing Valencia Province and was re-elected in the subsequent elections in 1989 serving until 1993.

Aside from politics, she worked as a deputy director in the regional finance and tax inspectorate.

References

1953 births
Living people
People from Valencia
Members of the 3rd Congress of Deputies (Spain)
Members of the 4th Congress of Deputies (Spain)
Politicians from the Valencian Community
Spanish women in politics
Spanish Socialist Workers' Party politicians
20th-century Spanish women